Desmaison is a French surname. Notable people with the surname include:

Jean Desmaison (1931–1991), French trade union leader
René Desmaison (1930–2007), French mountain climber
Walter Desmaison (born 1991), French rugby union player

French-language surnames